The 2009–10 HV71 season saw HV71's attempt to win the Swedish Championship title after having lost the previous season's final, which they succeeded to do. It was the 26th season in the Swedish elite league Elitserien for the club.

HV71 won the playoffs, beating Timrå IK 4–1 in the quarter final series, Skellefteå AIK 4–1 in the semi final series, and Djurgårdens IF 4–2 in the final series.

HV71 started the season in the beginning of August playing in the Nordic Trophy, which that year only consisted of Swedish teams. After having won the tournament round-robin stage, HV71 lost against Linköpings HC in the semi-final but clinched the bronzed medal defeating Frölunda HC. HV71 was also rewarded with 30,000 euro; 20,000 for winning the series and 10,000 for the bronze medal. On September 21, HV71 played its first game of the season, defeating Linköpings HC away with the score 6–2.

After 54 games of the regular season, HV71 lead the league table with one point over the second placed team, Linköpings HC. The last game of the regular season, HV71 faced Linköping away and managed to tie the game and win the regular season championship.

Offseason
January 16: Defenseman Lance Ward signed a two-year deal with HV71.

April 10: Defenseman Per Gustafsson and goaltender Andreas Andersson re-signed with HV71. Both agreed to a one-year extension.

April 14: Janne Karlsson signed for three years as head coach for HV71. HV71's previous head coach, Kent Johansson, signed earlier with the Swiss team HC Lugano.

April 17: Forwards David Ullström and Simon Önerud, and defenseman Nichlas Torp re-signed with HV71 for another two years.

April 20: Defenseman Johan Björk and winger Johan Lindström re-signed with HV71. Both agreed to a two-year extension. Forward and junior player André Petersson signed with HV71 for a one-year deal.

April 23: Finnish power forward Teemu Laine agreed with HV71 for a two-year extension. Goalie Stefan Liv re-signed with HV71 for another year.

April 24: Forward Oscar Sundh signed with HV71 for two years.

April 28: Canadian centre Kris Beech re-signed with HV71 for another two years.

April 29: Forward Per Ledin returned from play in NHL and AHL, and signed a six-year deal with HV71.

May 20: Forward Mattias Tedenby re-signed with HV71 and agreed to a two-year extension.

August 16: Finnish defenseman Janne Niinimaa signed with HV71 for one year.

Pre-season
HV71 began the pre-season playing in the Nordic Trophy tournament, a total of five games plus two playoff games, from August 11 to August 30, 2009.

Nordic Trophy

Standings

Game log

Playoffs

Regular season
HV71 won the regular season league title after a last game tie with Linköpings HC.

Standings

Game log

Playoffs
As winner of the regular series, HV71 received first pick to choose opponent for the quarterfinals. HV71 chose the 8th seed, Timrå IK. HV71 beat Timrå IK in five games, winning the series with 4–1 in games. For the semifinals, HV71 met Skellefteå AIK, the lowest seeded team remaining from the quarterfinals. In five games, HV71 won the semifinals and advanced to the finals where they met Djurgårdens IF, the regular season runner-up. In six games, where all but one game were decided in overtime, HV71 won their fourth Swedish Championship.

Player stats

Skaters
Note: GP = Games played; G = Goals; A = Assists; Pts = Points; +/- = Plus/minus; PIM = Penalties in Minutes

Regular season

Updated after the end of the regular season.

Playoffs

Goaltenders
Note: GP = Games played; TOI = Time on ice (minutes); W = Wins; L = Losses; T = Ties; OTW = Overtime Wins; OTL = Overtime Losses GA = Goals against; SO = Shutouts; Sv% = Save percentage; GAA = Goals against average

Regular season

Updated after the end of the regular season.

Playoffs

Transactions

Roster

Draft picks
HV71 players picked at the 2010 NHL Entry Draft.

References

2009-10
HV71